Komzet was the Committee for the Settlement of Toiling Jews on the Land (some English sources use the word "working" instead of "toiling") in the Soviet Union. The primary goal of the Komzet was to help impoverished and persecuted Jewish population of the former Pale of Settlement to adopt agricultural labor. Other goals were getting financial assistance from the Jewish diaspora and providing the Soviet Jews an alternative to Zionism.

Function 
The Komzet was a government committee whose function was to contribute and distribute the land for new kolkhozes. A complementary public society, the OZET was established in order to assist in moving settlers to a new location, housebuilding, irrigation, training, providing them with cattle and agricultural tools, education, medical and cultural services. The funds were to be provided by private donations, charities and lotteries.

History 
Established in 1921, Komzet was headed by P. G. Smidovich.

In 1924–1926, the Komzet helped to create several Jewish kolkhozes in various regions, most notably in Crimea, Ukraine and Stavropol region.

In 1927, following a failed attempt to establish Jewish autonomy in Crimea, the Birsko-Bidzhansky region in the Russian Far East was identified as a territory suitable for compact living of the Soviet Jews. The region would become the Jewish Autonomous Oblast but it did not attract the expected mass Jewish resettlement.

Komzet was abolished in 1938, as part of the process of dismantling almost all central nationalities institutions.

See also 
Organization for Jewish Colonisation in the Soviet Union (IKOR)
Society for Settling Toiling Jews on the Land (OZET)
History of the Jews in Russia and the Soviet Union
Jews and Judaism in the Jewish Autonomous Oblast
American Jewish Joint Distribution Committee 
Yevsektsiya

References

Further reading
 Robert Weinberg. Stalin's Forgotten Zion. Birobidzhan and the Making of a Soviet Jewish Homeland: An Illustrated History, 1928–1996 (University of California Press, 1998)) 
 Jonathan L. Dekel-Chen. Farming the Red Land: Jewish Agricultural Colonization and Local Soviet Power, 1924–1941 (Yale University Press, 2005)

External links 
 OZET lottery posters and tickets featured in Swarthmore College's online exhibition "Stalin's Forgotten Zion: Birobidzhan and the Making of a Soviet Jewish Homeland."
 Up From the "Ash Heap"? A Lost Chapter of Interwar Jewish History by Jonathan Dekel-Chen (Hebrew University of Jerusalem) from Colombia Journal of Historiography

Jews and Judaism in the Soviet Union
Jewish Autonomous Oblast
Soviet state institutions
Jewish settlement schemes in the Soviet Union
1921 establishments in Russia
1938 disestablishments in the Soviet Union